New Pittsburg is a census-designated place in Wayne County, in the U.S. state of Ohio. It lies northwest of Wooster, Ohio, along U.S. Route 250

History
New Pittsburg was laid out in 1829. A post office called New Pittsburgh was established in 1835, the name was changed to New Pittsburg in 1892, and the post office closed in 1907.

References

Unincorporated communities in Wayne County, Ohio
Unincorporated communities in Ohio